La Selva de Mar is a municipality in the comarca of Alt Empordà in Catalonia, Spain. It is quite small with a population of about 197. The nearest town is El Port de la Selva, a common destination for beach-going tourists.

References

External links
 Government data pages 

Municipalities in Alt Empordà
Populated places in Alt Empordà